The Malawi women's national football team is the national women's football team of Malawi and is overseen by the Football Association of Malawi.

History

2020s
In 2020 the nickname Scorchers was adopted for the team. Previoulsy they were referred to as the She-Flames.

Results and fixtures
 

The following is a list of match results in the last 12 months, as well as any future matches that have been scheduled.

2022

Source:globalsport

Achievements

Africa Women Cup of Nations record

Coaching staff

Players

Current squad
 This is the final  squad  named in August 2022   2022 COSAFA Women's Championship tournament.

 Caps and goals accurate up to and including 30 October 2021.

Recent call-ups
The following players have been called up to a Malawi  squad in the past 12 months.

Previous squads
COSAFA Women's Championship
 2020 COSAFA Women's Championship squad
 2022 COSAFA Women's Championship squad

Individual records

Active players in bold, statistics correct as of 2020.

Most capped players

Top goalscorers

Managers
 Temwa Msuku (2012)
 Thom Mkorongo (2015)
 Maggie Chombo-Sadik (2016–2018)
 Stuart Mbolembole (2018)
 Abel Mkandawire (2019)
 McNebert Kazuwa (2020–present)

Competitive record

FIFA Women's World Cup

Olympic Games

*Draws include knockout matches decided on penalty kicks.

Africa Women Cup of Nations

African Games

Regional

COSAFA Women's Championship

*Draws include knockout matches decided on penalty kicks.

See also
List of Malawi women's international footballers
Malawi women's national football team
Malawi women's national football team results

References

External links
Official website
FIFA Team Profile

 
African women's national association football teams